Jonathan Kiprotich Kitilit (born 24 April 1994) is a Kenyan middle-distance runner specialising in the 800 metres. His personal best time is 1:43.05, which he ran in Paris on 27 August 2016.

Personal bests
Outdoor
800 metres – 1:43.05 (Paris 2016)
1000 metres – 2:13.95 (Lausanne 2016)
1500 metres – 3:39.81 (Turku 2015)

References

1994 births
Living people
Kenyan male middle-distance runners
Athletes (track and field) at the 2018 Commonwealth Games
Commonwealth Games competitors for Kenya
People from Trans-Nzoia County